Estadio Ka'arendy, previously known as Estadio Leandro Ovelar, is a football stadium in Paraguay that is located in the downtown area of ​​the city of  Dr. Juan León Mallorquín, about 650 meters north of route PY02. After its renovation in 2022 it has an capacity of 10,120 seats. It is the home venue of Primera División club, General Caballero.

Name changing 
In April 2021, the club's board of directors ordered the new nomination of its sports arena as "Estadio Ka'arendy". The decision was made unanimously at the extraordinary meeting.

Ka'arendy is the previous name of the town, a name that continues in the memory of its inhabitants.

References 

Alto Paraná Department
Kaa